Ayelish McGarvey is a journalist covering the religious right. Her articles have appeared in The Nation, The American Prospect, Washington Monthly, and other liberal publications. In a cover story for The Nation, she broke the story about Bush appointee David Hager's personal life.

Ayelish is a graduate of Arcola High School in Arcola, IL and a graduate of Northwestern University in Evanston, IL.

The Revealer described McGarvey as a journalist of religion who also writes in the style of a sermon.

In the course of McGarvey's journalism and research on FDA advisor David Hager, McGarvey herself was the subject of scrutiny for her style of journalism.

References

American women journalists
People from Arcola, Illinois
Northwestern University alumni
Year of birth missing (living people)
Living people
Journalists from Illinois
21st-century American women